The Musée Régional de Tambacounda is a museum located in Senegal.

References

See also 
 List of museums in Senegal

Museums in Senegal